The 2017 THB Champions League is the top level football competition in Madagascar. It started on 1 September 2017.

First phase

Vondrona A

Vondrona B

Vondrona C

Vondrona D

Second phase

Vondrona 1

Vondrona 2

Final phase

References

External links
Soccerway

Football leagues in Madagascar
Premier League
Madagascar